Emre Aktaş (born 23 September 1986) is a Turkish professional footballer who plays as a forward for Orhangazispor.

References

External links

1986 births
Living people
Turkish footballers
İnegölspor footballers
Ankaraspor footballers
Ankara Keçiörengücü S.K. footballers
Malatyaspor footballers
Adanaspor footballers
Bucaspor footballers
Karşıyaka S.K. footballers
Turkey youth international footballers
Süper Lig players
Association football forwards